The New Jersey Department of Agriculture is a state governmental agency that is responsible for promotion and protection of agriculture and agribusiness in the state of New Jersey. The department oversees school meal programs, distributes surplus food from federal programs, oversees soil and water resources, maintains farmland for agricultural uses, assists in development of overseas markets for New Jersey products from its farms and fisheries and administers agricultural education programs.

, the New Jersey Secretary of Agriculture is Douglas H. Fisher, a former member of the New Jersey General Assembly from Cumberland County.

Organization
The department is jointly managed by the Secretary of Agriculture and the State Board of Agriculture. The Secretary is responsible for managing and directing the work of the department. In addition, the Secretary is the department’s executive officer, serves as secretary to the State Board of Agriculture and is a member of the Governor's cabinet. The Secretary is appointed by the State Board of Agriculture and is approved by the Governor.  New Jersey is the only state in the nation where the farmer constituents of the Department of Agriculture set policy and actively manage the department and select its Secretary.

The State Board of Agriculture, an eight-member body created by statute in 1887, serves as the policy-making and general head of the department. The Board is charged with setting policies which direct the Secretary and the department in carrying out its duties and responsibilities. Each member serves a four-year term, with two members replaced annually by new members elected at the State Agricultural Convention and appointed by the Governor with the approval of the State Senate. By law, at least four of the members must represent the top four commodity groups in the state based on a two-year average of the gross value of production.

State Board of Agriculture
Secretary of Agriculture
Office of the Secretary
Agricultural and Natural Resources Division
Animal Health Division
Food and Nutrition Division 
Marketing and Development Division 
Plant Industry Division

Agricultural education
Also found at the New Jersey Department of Agriculture is the Agricultural Education Division, led by Mrs. Nancy Trivette. The division oversees all agricultural education programs in New Jersey, as well as leading the New Jersey FFA Association. There are currently over 2,500 FFA members in the state of New Jersey spanning across 36 chapters.

New Jersey FFA Association Executive Board
The New Jersey Agricultural Education and FFA Executive Board is as follows:
State FFA Advisor: Mrs. Nancy Trivette
State FFA Specialist: Mrs. Erin Noble
State FFA Executive Assistant: Ms. Debra McCluskey
 
State FFA President: Myranda Bond, South Hunterdon FFA
State FFA Vice President: Morgan Rutar, Phillipsburg FFA
State FFA Secretary: Renée Stillwell, Allentown FFA
State FFA Treasurer: Jeremy Posluszny, Allentown FFA
State FFA Reporter: Zuri Richmond, Salem Co. Vo. Tech FFA
State FFA Sentinel: Josh Loew, Cumberland Regional FFA
State FFA Parliamentarian: Kelsey Stockton, Salem Co. Vo. Tech FFA
 
State FFA Executive Committee Chair: Hannah Mann, Salem Co. Vo. Tech FFA
State FFA Executive Committee: Tyler Kohlhaas, Cape May FFA 
State FFA Executive Committee: Alyssa Ferraro, Sussex Tech FFA
 
Teacher Representative: Mr. John Neyhart, Monmouth County FFA

Commodities councils
The Division works closely with seven commodity councils to help them publicize their products and bring the benefits of grower-sponsored research to consumers. The funds are used by each council for product research and improvement, promotional point-of-purchase materials and special promotional events.  These councils are funded by taxes levied on farmers, growers, and producers based on the quantity of goods produced. Grower-funded commodity councils have been established for apples, blueberries, milk, poultry, sweet potatoes, white potatoes, and wine.  These include:

 New Jersey Apple Industry Advisory Council 
 New Jersey Dairy Industry Advisory Council 
 New Jersey Poultry Products Promotion Council 
 New Jersey Wine Industry Advisory Council

List of Secretaries
Alva Agee (1916–1925)
William B. Duryee (1925–1938)
Willard H. Allen (1938–1956) 
Phillip Alampi (1956–1982)
Arthur R. Brown Jr. (1982–2002)
Charles M. Kuperus (2002–2008)
Douglas H. Fisher (2009–present)

References

External links

Agriculture
State departments of agriculture of the United States